Jhalle is a 2019 Indian Punjabi-language dark comedy film written and directed by Amarjit Singh Saron. The film is produced by Binnu Dhillon, Sargun Mehta and Manish Walia, under their respective banners Binnu Dhillon Production, Dreamiyata Entertainment and Manish Walia Production. It stars Dhillon and Mehta in lead roles. The filming began on 21 July 2019.
It was released on 15 November 2019.

Cast
 Binnu Dhillon 
 Sargun Mehta
 Pavan Malhotra
 Harby Sangha
 Honey Jalaf
 Jatinder Kaur
 Banninder Bunny
 Gurinder Dimmpy

Production
The film was announced on 9 July 2019,
with Binnu Dhillon and Sargun Mehta in lead roles. 

The film to be directed by Amarjit Singh and bankrolled by Binnu Dhillon, Sargun Mehta and Manish Walia. The filming began on 21 July, Mehta announced it in a post on her Twitter and Instagram accounts.

Release 
The official teaser was released by Speed Records on 19 October 2019.

It was scheduled to be theatrically released on 11 October 2019, but date was pushed to 15 November.

Soundtrack

The songs for the film are composed by  Diamondstar Worldwide and lyrics by Gurnam Bhullar and Garry Vinder.

References

External links
 

2019 films
Punjabi-language Indian films
2010s Punjabi-language films
Indian romantic comedy films
2019 romantic comedy films